Aliabad Rural District is in the Central District of Hashtrud County, East Azerbaijan province, Iran. At the National Census of 2006, its population was 5,595 in 1,231 households. There were 4,923 inhabitants in 1,312 households at the following census of 2011. At the most recent census of 2016, the population of the rural district was 4,320 in 1,305 households. The largest of its 22 villages was Aliabad-e Olya, with 825 people.

References 

Hashtrud County

Rural Districts of East Azerbaijan Province

Populated places in East Azerbaijan Province

Populated places in Hashtrud County